"Pseudologia Fantastica" is a song by American indie pop band Foster the People. It is the fifth track on their second studio album Supermodel and was released digitally as the record's second single on February 25, 2014.

Music video
The music video for "Pseudologia Fantastica" was conceptualized and directed by the band's frontman Mark Foster, with additional direction and animation being carried out by Hannes/Johannes; it was uploaded to the band's official Vevo account to YouTube on June 24, 2014.

Synopsis
A group of blind miners, are shown trying to mine for diamonds in a cleared area of a forest. They eventually strike diamonds, and an enchanted diamond emerges. It attracts every other diamond, and forms to create a wolf-like beast. The beast is shown with a greedy passion for diamonds. It creates birds that collect fish from the water, in the form of an assault rifle. Meanwhile, the miners are gathering in a city on an island, while a spiritual figure follows. The beast finally reaches the island, and is stationed on a building, and begins to act like a dictator, and orders the birds to collect the diamonds. The spirit reaches the city with flying creatures following it. The beast tries to fight it, casting a beam, but the creatures cast beams at it, creating a mass that outnumbers the beast, killing it. The enchanted diamond explodes, giving the miners vision, and they rejoice. The last shot shows the areas viewed empty, through a hand holding an enchanted diamond. The hand closes, and the film ends.

Track listing

Personnel
Foster the People
Cubbie Fink – bass, backing vocals
Mark Foster – lead vocals, synthesizer, piano, electric guitar
Mark Pontius – drums, backing vocals

Additional personnel
Isom Innis – backing vocals
Sean Cimino – guitar, backing vocals

Charts

Release history

References

2014 singles
Foster the People songs
2014 songs
Columbia Records singles
Song recordings produced by Paul Epworth
Songs written by Paul Epworth
Songs written by Mark Foster (singer)